The 2014–15 Volvo Ocean Race was the 12th edition of the round-the-world Volvo Ocean Race. It started on 19 October 2014 in Alicante, Spain, and concluded in June 2015 in Gothenburg, Sweden. After 38,739 nautical miles of ocean racing, Abu Dhabi Ocean Racing led by skipper Ian Walker claimed the overall trophy.

Yachts

For the first time, the race is a one-design event. The Volvo Ocean 65 was designed by Farr Yacht Design in response to concerns about safety and cost. The Volvo Ocean Race ensures a minimum of eight boats are built.

The aim was to reduce participation cost to around 15 million euros per entry.

The boats are maintained by a common team, The Boatyard. They manage the spares, repairs, and maintenance for all the teams.

Onboard reporters
For this edition of the race, each yacht had an onboard reporter. They are responsible for producing 4 minutes of video, 200 words, and 8 photographs a day. These media assets are sent to the Volvo Ocean Race Media Center in Alicante for editing and wide dissemination. OBRs were allowed to perform additional activities beyond producing content, however, they may not assist in the sailing of the boat.

Participants
Seven teams are participating in this edition of the Volvo Ocean Race. One of them, Team SCA, is a women-only team.

Sailors by nationality

Route

Notes  (157 sailing days for race winners and 10 In-port racing days):
  Originally scheduled to begin on 15 March 2015, but delayed because of Cyclone Pam.

Results
The point standings are done via low points. The winner of each leg/in-port race will receive 1 point, runner up will receive 2 points, and so on down to the final finisher who will receive 7 points. Failure to finish a leg is counted as 8 points. The overall winner will be the one the lowest number of leg points, with the in-port points being used for tie-breaking.

Overall Leg standings

Notes:
 - Team Vestas Wind was grounded on the Cargados Carajos Shoals near Mauritius. They re-joined the race for leg 8.
 - Dongfeng suffered a broken mast near Cape Horn and had to abandon leg 5.
 - Team Alvimedica finished leg 2 in fifth place, but were awarded 1 point redress for standing by the grounded Team Vestas Wind
 - MAPFRE finished leg 5 in second position, but were given two points penalty for rules breaches.
 - MAPFRE and Dongfeng (1 point each) and SCA (2 points) were handed penalty points after leg 7 for infringing sailing rules.

In-port series

Overall Results

Media
The race was chronicled in a daily show hosted by Genny Tulloch called Inside Tack - Life at the Extreme, and a weekly show -Life at the Extreme''.

References

External links

Volvo Ocean Race – Official site
Dongfeng  Team Page
SCA Team Page
Alvimedica Team Page
MAPFRE  Team Page
Vestas Wind Team Page
Brunel Team Page
Abu Dhabi  Team Page

The Ocean Race
2014 in sailing
2015 in sailing
2014 in Brazilian sport
2015 in New Zealand sport
2014 in Spanish sport
2015 in Brazilian sport
2015 in American sports
2015 in Swedish sport
2014 in Emirati sport
2015 in Portuguese sport
2015 in Chinese sport
2015 in French sport